Junoszyno  is a village in the administrative district of Gmina Stegna, within Nowy Dwór Gdański County, Pomeranian Voivodeship, in northern Poland.

The village has a population of 419.

See also 

 History of Pomerania

References

Junoszyno